Kevin Robinson (born 1955) is an Irish retired hurler who played as a midfielder for the Kilkenny senior team.

Robinson joined the team during the 1975 championship and was a senior panelist for just two seasons. An All-Ireland medalist in the All-Ireland minor and All-Ireland Under-21 hurling championships, he had little success at senior level. Robinson captained Kilkenny to the All-Ireland title at minor level in 1973.

At club level, Robsinson played with O'Loughlin Gaels.

References

 

1955 births
Living people
O'Loughlin Gaels hurlers
Kilkenny inter-county hurlers